Utricularia delphinioides is a small to medium-sized, probably perennial, carnivorous plant that belongs to the genus Utricularia. It is endemic to Indochina and can be found in Cambodia, Laos, Thailand, and Vietnam. It was originally named by Clovis Thorel but formally described and published by François Pellegrin in 1920. A variety, U. delphinioides var. minor, was also described in 1920, but Peter Taylor reduced the variety to synonymy under U. delphinioides because he discovered a continuous range of sizes between the larger and smaller forms, size being the only distinctive characteristic in the 1920 description of the variety.

See also 
 List of Utricularia species

References 

delphinioides
Carnivorous plants of Asia
Flora of Indo-China